Edward Ashford Lee (born October 3, 1957 in Puerto Rico) is an American computer scientist,
electrical engineer, and author.
He is Professor of the Graduate School and Robert S. Pepper Distinguished Professor Emeritus in the Electrical Engineering and Computer Science (EECS) Department at UC Berkeley.
Lee works in the areas of cyber-physical systems, embedded systems,
and the semantics of programming languages.
He is particularly known for his advocacy of deterministic
models for the engineering of cyber-physical systems.

Lee has led the Ptolemy Project, which has created Ptolemy II, an open-source model based design and simulation tool.
He ghost-edited a book about this software, where the editor of record is Claudius Ptolemaeus,
the 2nd century Greek astronomer, mathematician, and geographer.
The Kepler scientific workflow system is based on Ptolemy II.

From 2005 to 2008 Lee was chair of the Electrical Engineering Division and then chair of the EECS Department at UC Berkeley.
He has led a number of large research projects at Berkeley, including the
Center for Hybrid and Embedded Software Systems (CHESS),
the TerraSwarm Research Center, and
the Industrial Cyber-Physical Systems Research Center (iCyPhy).

Lee has written several textbooks, covering subjects including
embedded systems,
digital communications,
and
signals and systems.
He has also published two general-audience books, Plato and the Nerd: The Creative Partnership of Humans and Technology and The Coevolution: The Entwined Futures of Humans and Machines (2020),
where he examines the relationship between humans and technology.

Biography
Lee was born in San Juan, Puerto Rico in 1957.
His father, a prominent businessman and later a bankruptcy lawyer, was a descendant of notable Puerto Ricans
Alejandro Tapia y Rivera, a poet and playwright,
and Bailey Ashford, a pioneering physician in the treatment of tropical anemia.
His mother was originally from Kentucky, but moved around the country many times following her career Army father, Charles P. Nicholas, a mathematician who worked on scientific intelligence during World War II (work for which he was twice awarded the Legion of Merit). Nicholas went on to serve as a member of the original organizing team for national Central Intelligence, and later moved to West Point, where he became head of the Math Department at the United States Military Academy.

At age 14, Lee left home to attend the Lawrenceville School, a boarding school in New Jersey.
From there he went to Yale University, where he flitted between majors before settling on a double major
in Computer Science and Engineering and Applied Science.
In 1979, Lee was hired by Bell Labs, which paid for him to go to the Massachusetts Institute of Technology,
where he earned a Science Masters (SM) in Electrical Engineering and Computer Science in 1980.
He then moved back to New Jersey to work at the Bell Labs Holmdel Complex, where he met his future wife, Rhonda Righter.
At Bell Labs, Lee worked on the world's first software-defined modem.
In 1982, Lee returned to school to get a PhD in the EECS Department at UC Berkeley.
In 1986, he finished his PhD and was hired to the faculty at Berkeley, where he has been ever since.
In 2018, Lee retired from teaching to focus full-time on research and writing.

Books
 The Coevolution: The Entwined Futures of Humans and Machines (2020)
 Plato and the Nerd: The Creative Partnership of Humans and Technology (2017)
 Introduction to Embedded Systems: A Cyber-Physical Systems Approach (2017)
 System Design, Modeling, and Simulation using Ptolemy II (2014)
 Digital Communication (1988,1994,2004)
 Structure and Interpretation of Signals and Systems (2003,2011)
 DSP Processor Fundamentals: Architectures and Features (1997)
 Software Synthesis from Dataflow Graphs (1996)

Awards
 The Berkeley Citation, February, 2018.
 Outstanding Technical Achievement and Leadership Award from the IEEE Technical Committee on Real-Time Systems (TCRTS), 2016.
 Robert S. Pepper Distinguished Professorship, UC Berkeley, 2006.
 ASEE Frederick Emmons Terman Award, 1997.
 NSF Presidential Young Investigator Award, 1997.

External links
 Edward A. Lee's home page at UC Berkeley
 Ptolemy Project home page at UC Berkeley
 Edward A. Lee's complete publications
 Google Scholar listing

Interviews and Debates
 TechNation, with Moira Gunn, December 7, 2017
 Virtual Futures, with Luke Robert Mason, October 8, 2017
 Tech Talk: Swarm Boxes, Semiconductor Engineering, March 18, 2015
 Software Patent Debate, Computer History Museum, August 30, 2011

References

1957 births
American electrical engineers
Scientists at Bell Labs
UC Berkeley College of Engineering alumni
MIT School of Engineering alumni
Living people
Yale University alumni